Oleksiy Slivinsky (born 8 August 1972 in Dobrotvir) is a Ukrainian sprint canoeist who competed from the late 1990s to the mid-2000s (decade). He won six medals at the ICF Canoe Sprint World Championships with a gold (K-4 200 m: 2003), three silvers (K-1 200 m: 1998, 1999, 2001), and two bronzes (K-1 200 m: 1997, K-4 200 m: 2001).

Slivinskiy also competed in the K-4 1000 m event at the 1996 Summer Olympics in Atlanta, but was eliminated in the semifinals.

References

Sports-reference.com profile

1972 births
Canoeists at the 1996 Summer Olympics
Living people
Olympic canoeists of Ukraine
Ukrainian male canoeists
ICF Canoe Sprint World Championships medalists in kayak
Sportspeople from Lviv Oblast